"A Boy Like That/I Have A Love" is a song from the 1957 Broadway musical West Side Story, with music by Leonard Bernstein and lyrics by Stephen Sondheim. In the musical, the song is sung by the characters Anita and Maria. For the original Broadway cast recording, the song was performed by Chita Rivera (Anita) and Carol Lawrence (Maria). In the 1961 film version the roles were played by Rita Moreno and Natalie Wood, but the songs were dubbed by Betty Wand and Marni Nixon (as both Anita and Maria). However, the repeat of the two stanzas, sung by Anita, along with Maria's counterpoint of her defense, was omitted because of the complexity of the song, as well as to avoid the repetition, which would have slowed down the pace of the film. In the 2021 film, the roles were played by Ariana DeBose and Rachel Zegler.

In 2010, Lin-Manuel Miranda and Raúl Esparza performed the song at Broadway Backwards, an annual Broadway Cares/Equity Fights AIDS showcase of show tunes sung by different genders. Miranda played Anita, while Esparza played Maria.

Selena version

In 1995 Selena recorded "A Boy Like That" for the various-artists compilation album The Songs of West Side Story, which was a benefit for AIDS Project Los Angeles. Her version of the song was released posthumously as a single in 1996 by RCA Victor, with the maxi-single including four remixes by Tony Moran. The song was also included on the soundtrack album Selena.  David Pack produced the track and Sheila E. performed percussion.  Additional vocals were provided by Michelle Weeks, Godwin, and Nikki Richards.

Track listing
US remixes
 "A Boy Like That" (radio edit 1) - 4:06 	
 "A Boy Like That" (radio edit 2) - 4:06 	
 "A Boy Like That" (original edit) - 3:28 	
 "A Boy Like That" (extended remix) - 8:14 	
 "A Boy Like That" (guitar mix) - 4:54 	
 "A Boy Like That" (dub mix) - 8:40 	
 "A Boy Like That" (tribal mix) - 7:13 	
 "A Boy Like That" (original full version) - 5:51

References

1957 songs
1997 singles
EMI Records singles
Selena songs
Songs from West Side Story
Songs with music by Leonard Bernstein
Songs released posthumously
Songs written by Stephen Sondheim